Liam Davie (born 26 March 1993) is a British artistic gymnast. He represented Scotland at the 2014 Commonwealth Games in Glasgow. As part of the Scotland team, Davie won a silver medal in the team all-around competition.

References

External links
 
 

1993 births
Living people
British male artistic gymnasts
Scottish gymnasts
Scottish sportsmen
Commonwealth Games medallists in gymnastics
Commonwealth Games silver medallists for Scotland
Gymnasts at the 2014 Commonwealth Games
Medallists at the 2014 Commonwealth Games